PM3 is a sub-machine gun type firearm produced by PT Pindad. This weapon is designed for urban warfare or other close combat. This weapon uses 9x19mm parabellum caliber bullets and is effective up to a distance of 75 meters. Unlike the previous generation, PM2, which uses blowback mechanism, PM3 uses a gas operated mechanism. PM3 also has rail integration system, which allows wider variety of attachments to be installed, such as sights and grips.

Users 
: 95 PM3s used by Indonesian Marine Corps.

References 

9mm Parabellum submachine guns